That Sweet Word: Liberty! (translit. Eto sladkoye slovo — svoboda!) is a 1972 Soviet drama film directed by Vytautas Žalakevičius. The second part of the "Latin American trilogy", of which the first film was The Whole Truth about Columbus and the final one Centaurs. It was entered into the 8th Moscow International Film Festival where it won the Golden Prize. The film was shot in Chile shortly before 1973 Chilean coup d'état. The basis for the plot is a real story: the escape from San-Carlos prison in Venezuela of three political prisoners — Guillermo García Ponce, Pompeyo Márquez and Teodoro Petkoff.

Plot
In an unnamed Latin American country after a coup d'état, a military junta comes to power. The army deployed to the streets, the civilian population is exposed to hard terror. A wave of arrests follows, some former senators - liberals and communists - are sent to prison.

Some patriots that have gone underground try to figure a plan for their release. They buy a small shop opposite the prison in the name of Francisco and Maria Vardes. From its basement they plan to build a 90-meter tunnel.

Three years of enormous effort, deaths and nervous breakdowns are not spent in vain. The inmates run away, but while at large, the oldest of them, Senator Miguel Carrera suffers a heart failure. He dies in a safe house on the eve of a meeting with journalists.

Cast
 Lorents Arushanyan as Walter Conde, senator
 Regimantas Adomaitis as Francisco "Pancho" Vardes'
 Bronius Babkauskas as Miguel Carrera, senator (voiced by Valentin Gaft)
 Juozas Budraitis as Felicio, blackmailer (voiced by Valentin Nikulin)
 Irina Miroshnichenko as Maria
 Rodion Nakhapetov as Benedicto
 Ion Ungureanu as Alberto Ramirez
 Vytautas Paukštė as prison doctor
 Mihai Volontir as Carlos

References

External links
 

1972 drama films
1972 films
1970s Russian-language films
Soviet drama films
Mosfilm films